Live... With a Little Help from Our Friends is a live recording of Gov't Mule's 1998 New Year's Eve concert at The Roxy in Atlanta, Georgia. It was released as a 4-CD set Collector's Edition and as two separate albums.

Track listing

Live... With a Little Help From Our Friends   Collector's Edition

Disc One
"Wandering Child" (Haynes/Abts) – 7:45 
"Thorazine Shuffle" (Haynes/Abts) – 9:02
"No Need to Suffer" (Haynes) – 8:12 
"Dolphineus" (Haynes/Woody/Abts) – 1:22
"War Pigs" (Iommi/Osbourne/Butler/Ward) – 8:24
"30 Days in the Hole" (Marriott) – 6:32
"Mr. Big" (Rodgers/Fraser/Kirke/Kossoff) – 8:07
"The Hunter" (Jones/Wells/Jackson/Dunn/Cropper) – 8:34

Disc Two
"Gambler's Roll" (Haynes/ Neel) – 13:46 *
"Look on Yonder Wall" (James/Sehorn) – 10:40
"32-20 Blues" (Johnson) – 9:36 *
"I Shall Return" (Haynes) – 9:36 *
"Soulshine" (Haynes) – 9:19
"Mule" (Haynes/Woody/Abts) – 17:35

Disc Three
"Spanish Moon" (George) – 20:10
"Sad and Deep as You" (Mason) – 13:56
"Third Stone from the Sun" (Hendrix) – 16:57 *
"Devil Likes It Slow" (Haynes) – 10:38
"Cortez the Killer" (Young) – 14:13

Disc Four
"Afro-Blue" (Santamaria) – 29:30
"Pygmy Twylyte" (Zappa) – 5:16 [Studio Outtake]

* on the Collector's Edition only

Live... With A Little Help From Our Friends

Disc One
"Thorazine Shuffle" (Haynes/Abts) – 9:02
"Dolphineus" (Haynes/Woody/Abts) – 1:22
"War Pigs" (Iommi/Osborne/Butler/Ward) – 8:24
"30 Days in the Hole" (Marriott) – 6:32
"Mr. Big" (Rodgers/Fraser/Kirke/Kossoff) – 8:07
"Look on Yonder Wall" (James/Sehorn) – 10:40
"Soulshine" (Haynes) – 9:19
"Mule" (Haynes/Woody/Abts) – 17:35

Disc Two
"Sad and Deep as You" (Mason) – 13:56
"Devil Likes It Slow" (Haynes) – 10:38
"Cortez the Killer" (Young) – 14:13
"Afro-Blue" (Santamaria) – 29:30

Live... With A Little Help From Our Friends   Volume 2
"Wandering Child" (Haynes/Abts) – 7:45
"No Need to Suffer" (Haynes) – 8:12
"The Hunter" (Jones/Wells/Jackson/Dunn/Cropper) – 8:34
"Spanish Moon" (George) – 20:10
"Pygmy Twylyte" (Zappa) – 5:16 [Bonus Track]

Personnel

Gov't Mule
Warren Haynes – vocals, guitar
Matt Abts – drums
Allen Woody – bass

Additional Personnel
Michael Barbiero – mixing. production
Kirk West – vocal introduction on "Wandering Child"
Marc Ford – guitar, vocals
Chuck Leavell – piano
Derek Trucks – guitar
Bernie Worrell – organ
Yonrico Scott – percussion
Randall Bramblett – saxophone
Jimmy Herring – guitar

References

Gov't Mule albums
1999 live albums
Live album series
Capricorn Records live albums